George Camiller (born 30 November 1942) is an English actor. He is best known for playing the role of Giovanni Capello, a student in Jeremy Brown's EFL class in the popular British sitcom Mind Your Language and one of four students (along with Juan Cervantes, Anna Schmidt, and Ranjeet Singh) to appear in all four series.
He has also acted in a number of movies and TV series.

Selected credits

Film 
 The Message (1976) as Walid ibn Utbah
 Arifa (2019)

Television 
 Mind Your Language (1977–1987) as Giovanni Capello 
 Jesus of Nazareth (1977) as Hosias
 Strangers (1978) episode "Marriages, Deaths and Births" as Johnny Carmos

References 

1942 births
Male actors from London
English male film actors
English male television actors
20th-century English male actors
Living people